Michael Dennis Ferraro (born August 18, 1944) is an American former Major League Baseball third baseman. He played for the New York Yankees and the Seattle Pilots/Milwaukee Brewers.

Early life and amateur career
Ferraro attended Kingston High School in Kingston, New York where he played baseball, basketball and football. As a senior in high school, he led all of Dutchess, Ulster, Sullivan and Orange Counties with a .585 batting average on the baseball field and with 21.5 points per game on the basketball court.

Professional playing career
Ferraro was originally signed as an amateur free agent by the Yankees, where he would have two stints in the Majors with New York. He was left unprotected in the 1968 expansion draft, and he was selected by the Seattle Pilots, but after only five games and four at-bats, he was traded to the Baltimore Orioles, where he spent two years in the minors. However, in October 1971, Ferraro was traded back to the Brewers (the Pilots moved to Milwaukee after only one season in Seattle), where he would play his only season as a regular player. He played in 124 games during the 1972 season, batting .255 with two home runs and 29 RBI. In 1973, Ferraro was traded to the Minnesota Twins, but was promptly released. He tried one last comeback with the Yankees in 1974, but he never made it back to the Majors.

Managerial career
After his playing career ended, Ferraro turned to managing in the Yankee farm system in 1974, and he was highly successful in his five-year career (through 1978), winning pennants at Class A, Double-A and Triple-A levels. In 1979, he became the Yankees' third-base coach. Ferraro was involved in a controversial play during Game 2 of the 1980 American League Championship Series. Willie Randolph was on second base in the top of the eighth with two outs and the Yankees down by a run. Bob Watson hit a ball to the left field corner of Royals Stadium. The ball bounced right to Willie Wilson, but Wilson was not known for having a great arm, and Ferraro waved Randolph home. Wilson overthrew U L Washington, the cut-off man, but George Brett was in position behind him to catch the ball, then throw to Darrell Porter, who tagged out Randolph in a slide. TV cameras captured a furious George Steinbrenner fuming immediately after the play. The Yankees lost the game 3–2, then lost the series in three games. After the game, Steinbrenner publicly criticized Ferraro for the call. Steinbrenner wanted Ferraro fired immediately, but manager Dick Howser stuck up for him and refused to do so. Tommy John said that, "By refusing to fire Ferraro, Howser sealed his fate as Yankee manager."

Though Howser did not return to the Yankees in 1981, Ferraro remained with the team as a coach through the 1982 season. He coached for the Yankees again in 1987–88 and 1990–91.

Ferraro coached with the Kansas City Royals from 1984 to 1986, working again with Howser, and when Howser stepped down to undergo treatment for a brain tumor in July 1986, Ferraro, a survivor of kidney cancer, finished the season before being released by the Royals. His Major League managerial record was 76–98 over parts of two seasons. He also worked as the third base coach of the Baltimore Orioles in 1993.

Managerial record

References

External links

1944 births
Living people
Baltimore Orioles coaches
Baseball coaches from New York (state)
Baseball players from New York (state)
Cleveland Indians managers
Columbus Confederate Yankees players
Fort Lauderdale Yankees managers
Fort Lauderdale Yankees players
Kansas City Royals coaches
Kansas City Royals managers
Major League Baseball bench coaches
Major League Baseball first base coaches
Major League Baseball third base coaches
Major League Baseball third basemen
Milwaukee Brewers players
New York Yankees coaches
New York Yankees players
Sportspeople from Kingston, New York
Rochester Red Wings players
Seattle Pilots players
Shelby Colonels players
Spokane Indians players
Syracuse Chiefs players
Tacoma Twins players
Toledo Mud Hens players